Sadat Mahalleh-ye Rudbast (also Romanized as Sādāt Maḩalleh-ye Rūdbast; also known as Sādāt Maḩalleh) is a village in Babolrud Rural District, in the Central District of Babolsar County, Mazandaran Province, Iran. At the 2006 census, its population was 1,016, in 280 families.

References 

Populated places in Babolsar County